

Campuses
Selkirk College has eight campuses and learning centres across the West Kootenay and Kootenay Boundary regions: 
 Castlegar Campus
 Grand Forks Campus
 Kaslo Learning Centre
 Nakusp Learning Centre
 Silver King Campus
 Tenth Street Campus
 Trail Campus
 Victoria Street Campus

Programs
Selkirk currently has 2,239 students in eight locations and offers a variety of academic, career, vocational and technical programs. Programs are offered part-time, full-time and online through the following schools of study:
 School of the Arts 
 School of Academic Upgrading & Development 
* School of Business 
 School of Environment & Geomatics 
 School of Health & Human Services 
 School of Hospitality & Tourism
 School of Industry & Trades Training 
 Selkirk International 
 School of University Arts & Sciences

Student life

Local arts, culture and heritage

Students of Selkirk College have access to a variety of local arts, culture and heritage facilities within the municipalities of Castlegar, Grand Forks, Kaslo, Nelson, Rossland and Trail. Museums and galleries include the Doukhobor Discovery Centre, Kootenay Gallery, Langham Cultural Centre, Oxygen Art Centre, Quoynary Canada Rossland Art Gallery, Rossland Museum & Discovery Centre, Touchstones Museum, and VISAC Gallery.

Outdoor recreation and athletics
Selkirk College campuses are often within short drives to a variety of outdoor recreation sites. 
 Hiking and snowshoeing trails include the Brilliant Look Out, Dove Hill, Little McPhee Waterfall, Mel De Anna, Pulpit Rock, Seven Summits, etc.
 Local downhill skiing areas include Red Mountain Ski Resort, Salmo Ski Hill, and Whitewater Ski Resort.
 Local Nordic skiing locations include Blackjack, Beaver Valley Ski Club, Castlegar Nordic Ski Club, the Great Northern Rail Trail, Nelson Nordic Ski Club, etc.

On campus recreation
 Clubs, fitness classes and drop-in sports are offered within both Selkirk gymnasiums (located on the Castlegar and Tenth Street Campus).
 An extensive walking trail system surrounds the Castlegar Campus. The campus is also home to a gymnasium that houses a climbing wall, squash court, and weight room.
 The Mary Hall building on Nelson's Tenth Street Campus includes a gymnasium, weight room, and Cube Climbing Centre.

Student housing
Selkirk College currently has two student housing buildings that can collectively house 209 students. Student housing at the Castlegar Campus offers 100 beds and Nelson's Tenth Street Campus offers 109 beds. A new student housing development has been confirmed to commence in 2022.  A new building at the Castlegar Campus will provide 112 new beds, and 36 beds will be offered in a new building on the Silver King Campus in Nelson.

Notable alumni
Kiesza, musician
Mitch Merrett, record producer
 Roz Nay, novelist.

See also
List of institutes and colleges in British Columbia
List of universities in British Columbia
Higher education in British Columbia
Education in Canada

References

External links
Selkirk College

Colleges in British Columbia
Educational institutions established in 1966
Castlegar, British Columbia
1966 establishments in British Columbia